Pontus Jäntti (born 20 December 1968) is a Finnish badminton player. He competed at the 1992 Summer Olympics and the 1996 Summer Olympics.

References

1968 births
Living people
Finnish male badminton players
Olympic badminton players of Finland
Badminton players at the 1992 Summer Olympics
Badminton players at the 1996 Summer Olympics
Sportspeople from Helsinki
20th-century Finnish people